is a Japanese pop singer. He is a self-trained musician, and performs in the shimauta (island-song) style of his hometown.

Discography

Albums
 [1999.04.04] Atari (アタリ) (Indies)
 [2000.07.30] Kurudando (くるだんど) (Indies)
 [2002.06.09] Shodon (諸鈍;Place Name) (Indies)
 [2004.09.03] Notus (ノトス) (Indies)
 [2006.11.03] Chu Dong Xin Xian (触動心弦;Touch Strings of Your Heart)
 [2007.07.11] Yurai Bana (ユライ花; The First Flower)
 [2007.07.13] Hua Jian Dao (花間道;Road Between Flowers)
 [2008.10.01] Kizuna Uta (絆歌; Bond Songs)

Mini-Albums
 [2005.09.07] Materia (マテリヤ) (Indies)
 [2006.10.11] Natsukasha no Shima (なつかしゃのシマ; The Island I Miss)

Singles
 [2006.03.01] Sorezore ni (それぞれに; In Each and Every)
 [2006.06.28] Omoide no Sugu Soba de / Mahiru no Hanabi (思い出のすぐそばで / 真昼の花火; Right Next to Memories / Midday Fireworks)
 [2007.04.11] Hana (花; Flower)
 [2007.11.14] Tane wo Maku Hibi (種をまく日々; The Days When Seeds are Scattered)
 [2008.04.09] Haru (春; Spring)
 [2008.09.03] Kizuna (絆; bonds)
 [2009.03.25] Koi (恋; Love)

Collaborations/Other
 [2002.07.24] Various Artists – Amami Shima Uta (#2. Asabanabushi No. 9. Kurudando, No. 13. Rankanhashi)
 [2004.05.26] Various Artists – Okinawa Songs ~Watashita Uta~ (#14. IRAYOI Tsukiyo Hama)
 [2005.12.21] Masayoshi Yamazaki Tribute Album – One More Time, One More Track (#3. HOME)
 [2008.08.22] Cape No.7 OST – Heidenröslein(wild rose)(Van Fan & Kousuke Atari)

Films
 Cape No. 7 (2008) – Teacher / Himself – Singer
 "Taipei Exchanges" (2010) – Singing Customer/ Tourist
 "Happiness Me Too" (2012)

Trivia
 The song "Natsu Yuuzora (夏夕空; Summer Evening Sky)" was used as the ending theme in the Japanese anime adaptation of the manga series 「Natsume Yuujinchou」(夏目友人帳). He also performed the song, "Kimi no Kakera (君ノカケラ; Pieces of You)", which was used in the third season.
 The single "Tane wo Maku Hibi (種をまく日々; The Days When Seeds are Scattered)" was used as the thirteenth ending theme in the anime series 「Bleach」.
 The single "Koi (恋; Love)" was used as the ending theme in the anime series 「Genji Monogatari Sennenki」(源氏物語千年紀).

References

External links

Sony Music Entertainment Japan artists
Living people
1980 births
Japanese male pop singers
Musicians from Kagoshima Prefecture
People from the Amami Islands
Japanese male musicians
Mandarin-language singers of Japan
21st-century Japanese singers
21st-century Japanese male singers